Suryakant Pradhan (born 30 September 1993) is an Indian first-class cricketer who plays for Odisha. He was the leading wicket-taker for Odisha in the 2017–18 Ranji Trophy, with 14 dismissals in six matches.

References

External links
 

1993 births
Living people
Indian cricketers
Odisha cricketers
People from Khordha district
Cricketers from Odisha